Mount Kato is a winter sports facility in Minnesota, offering facilities for skiing, snowboarding, snow tubing and mountain biking. It is located just south of the city of Skyline in the Mankato metropolitan area.

External links
Official Mount Kato Website

References

Buildings and structures in Blue Earth County, Minnesota
Ski areas and resorts in Minnesota
Tourist attractions in Blue Earth County, Minnesota